Deadheart is an Australian rock/pop band from Geelong. The band released two albums in the 1990s and finished in 2000 when singer and songwriter Ron Thorpe was killed in a car accident. Thorpe had previously played with No Fixed Address and performed on the Terrasphere album and had been removed from his parents at the age of five.

Discography
Deadheart (1994) – CAAMA
Sista Krista (1998) – CAAMA

References

Indigenous Australian musical groups
Musical groups from Geelong